Carex omiana, also known as suwon sedge, is a tussock-forming species of perennial sedge in the family Cyperaceae. It is native to north eastern parts of China, Japan and the Kuril Islands.

See also
List of Carex species

References

omiana
Taxa named by Adrien René Franchet
Taxa named by Ludovic Savatier
Plants described in 1878
Flora of Japan
Flora of Manchuria
Flora of the Kuril Islands